The 5th constituency of the Aisne is a French legislative constituency in the Aisne département.

Description

Aisne's 5th constituency covers the southern portion of the department, the area is centred on Château-Thierry on the river Marne.

Politically the seat elected conservatives for all the Fifth Republic with the exceptions of during the Mitterrand years between 1981 and 1993 and after the 2012 election.

At the 2012 election a National Front candidate secured a place in the 2nd round splitting the right's vote and allowing the election of Jacques Krabal of the left leaning PRG. Krabal subsequently switched to the centrist La République En Marche!.

Historic Representation

Election results

2022

2017

2012

|- style="background-color:#E9E9E9;text-align:center;"
! colspan="2" rowspan="2" style="text-align:left;" | Candidate
! rowspan="2" colspan="2" style="text-align:left;" | Party
! colspan="2" | 1st round
! colspan="2" | 2nd round
|- style="background-color:#E9E9E9;text-align:center;"
! width="75" | Votes
! width="30" | %
! width="75" | Votes
! width="30" | %
|-
| style="background-color:" |
| style="text-align:left;" | Jacques Krabal
| style="text-align:left;" | Radical Party of the Left
| PRG
| 
| 29.79%
| 
| 42.21%
|-
| style="background-color:" |
| style="text-align:left;" | Isabelle Vasseur
| style="text-align:left;" | Union for a Popular Movement
| UMP
| 
| 31.22%
| 
| 36.70%
|-
| style="background-color:" |
| style="text-align:left;" | Frank Briffaut
| style="text-align:left;" | National Front
| FN
| 
| 22.74%
| 
| 21.09%
|-
| style="background-color:" |
| style="text-align:left;" | Dominique Jourdain
| style="text-align:left;" | Europe Ecology – The Greens
| EELV
| 
| 9.79%
| colspan="2" style="text-align:left;" | 
|-
| style="background-color:" |
| style="text-align:left;" | Mireille Ausecache
| style="text-align:left;" | Left Front
| FG
| 
| 4.46%
| colspan="2" style="text-align:left;" | 
|-
| style="background-color:" |
| style="text-align:left;" | Sylvie Geret
| style="text-align:left;" | Far Left
| ExG
| 
| 1.03%
| colspan="2" style="text-align:left;" | 
|-
| style="background-color:" |
| style="text-align:left;" | Jean-Claude Poiret
| style="text-align:left;" | Miscellaneous Right
| DVD
| 
| 0.98%
| colspan="2" style="text-align:left;" | 
|-
| colspan="8" style="background-color:#E9E9E9;"|
|- style="font-weight:bold"
| colspan="4" style="text-align:left;" | Total
| 
| 100%
| 
| 100%
|-
| colspan="8" style="background-color:#E9E9E9;"|
|-
| colspan="4" style="text-align:left;" | Registered voters
| 
| style="background-color:#E9E9E9;"|
| 
| style="background-color:#E9E9E9;"|
|-
| colspan="4" style="text-align:left;" | Blank/Void ballots
| 
| 1.31%
| 
| 1.66%
|-
| colspan="4" style="text-align:left;" | Turnout
| 
| 59.37%
| 
| 60.75%
|-
| colspan="4" style="text-align:left;" | Abstentions
| 
| 40.63%
| 
| 39.25%
|-
| colspan="8" style="background-color:#E9E9E9;"|
|- style="font-weight:bold"
| colspan="6" style="text-align:left;" | Result
| colspan="2" style="background-color:" | PRG gain
|}

2007

|- style="background-color:#E9E9E9;text-align:center;"
! colspan="2" rowspan="2" style="text-align:left;" | Candidate
! rowspan="2" colspan="2" style="text-align:left;" | Party
! colspan="2" | 1st round
! colspan="2" | 2nd round
|- style="background-color:#E9E9E9;text-align:center;"
! width="75" | Votes
! width="30" | %
! width="75" | Votes
! width="30" | %
|-
| style="background-color:" |
| style="text-align:left;" | Isabelle Vasseur
| style="text-align:left;" | Union for a Popular Movement
| UMP
| 
| 37.84%
| 
| 53.96%
|-
| style="background-color:" |
| style="text-align:left;" | Dominique Jourdain
| style="text-align:left;" | Socialist Party
| PS
| 
| 20.75%
| 
| 46.04%
|-
| style="background-color:" |
| style="text-align:left;" | Jacques Krabal
| style="text-align:left;" | Miscellaneous Left
| DVG
| 
| 17.67%
| colspan="2" style="text-align:left;" |
|-
| style="background-color:" |
| style="text-align:left;" | Franck Briffaut
| style="text-align:left;" | National Front
| FN
| 
| 8.42%
| colspan="2" style="text-align:left;" |
|-
| style="background-color:" |
| style="text-align:left;" | Renaud Belliere
| style="text-align:left;" | Democratic Movement
| MoDem
| 
| 4.51%
| colspan="2" style="text-align:left;" |
|-
| style="background-color:" |
| style="text-align:left;" | Jean-Luc Allioux
| style="text-align:left;" | Communist
| COM
| 
| 2.19%
| colspan="2" style="text-align:left;" |
|-
| style="background-color:" |
| style="text-align:left;" | Brigitte Fourquet
| style="text-align:left;" | Far Left
| EXG
| 
| 1.99%
| colspan="2" style="text-align:left;" |
|-
| style="background-color:" |
| style="text-align:left;" | Marie-Thérèse Chambaud
| style="text-align:left;" | The Greens
| VEC
| 
| 1.70%
| colspan="2" style="text-align:left;" |
|-
| style="background-color:" |
| style="text-align:left;" | Sylvie Geret
| style="text-align:left;" | Far Left
| EXG
| 
| 1.63%
| colspan="2" style="text-align:left;" |
|-
| style="background-color:" |
| style="text-align:left;" | Olivier Papritz
| style="text-align:left;" | Movement for France
| MPF
| 
| 1.31%
| colspan="2" style="text-align:left;" |
|-
| style="background-color:" |
| style="text-align:left;" | Annick Deryckere
| style="text-align:left;" | Hunting, Fishing, Nature, Traditions
| CPNT
| 
| 1.05%
| colspan="2" style="text-align:left;" |
|-
| style="background-color:" |
| style="text-align:left;" | Marc-Hervé Rey
| style="text-align:left;" | Ecologist
| ECO
| 
| 0.89%
| colspan="2" style="text-align:left;" |
|-
| style="background-color:" |
| style="text-align:left;" | Aude Allegraud
| style="text-align:left;" | Divers
| DIV
| 
| 0.06%
| colspan="2" style="text-align:left;" |
|-
| colspan="8" style="background-color:#E9E9E9;"|
|- style="font-weight:bold"
| colspan="4" style="text-align:left;" | Total
| 
| 100%
| 
| 100%
|-
| colspan="8" style="background-color:#E9E9E9;"|
|-
| colspan="4" style="text-align:left;" | Registered voters
| 
| style="background-color:#E9E9E9;"|
| 
| style="background-color:#E9E9E9;"|
|-
| colspan="4" style="text-align:left;" | Blank/Void ballots
| 
| 1.61%
| 
| 3.56%
|-
| colspan="4" style="text-align:left;" | Turnout
| 
| 60.73%
| 
| 60.45%
|-
| colspan="4" style="text-align:left;" | Abstentions
| 
| 39.27%
| 
| 39.55%
|-
| colspan="8" style="background-color:#E9E9E9;"|
|- style="font-weight:bold"
| colspan="6" style="text-align:left;" | Result
| colspan="2" style="background-color:" | UMP HOLD
|}

References

Sources
 Official results of French elections from 1998: 

5